Roccasecca dei Volsci is a comune (municipality) in the Province of Latina in the Italian region Lazio, located about  southeast of Rome and about  east of Latina.

Roccasecca dei Volsci borders the following municipalities: Amaseno, Priverno, Prossedi, Sonnino.

Twin towns
 Saint-Romans, France

References

Cities and towns in Lazio